In enzymology, a phenylalanine—tRNA ligase is an enzyme that catalyzes the chemical reaction

ATP + L-phenylalanine + tRNAPhe  AMP + diphosphate + L-phenylalanyl-tRNAPhe

The 3 substrates of this enzyme are ATP, L-phenylalanine, and tRNAPhe, whereas its 3 products are AMP, diphosphate, and L-phenylalanyl-tRNAPhe.

This enzyme belongs to the family of ligases, to be specific those forming carbon-oxygen bonds in aminoacyl-tRNA and related compounds.  The systematic name of this enzyme class is L-phenylalanine:tRNAPhe ligase (AMP-forming). Other names in common use include phenylalanyl-tRNA synthetase, phenylalanyl-transfer ribonucleate synthetase, phenylalanine-tRNA synthetase, phenylalanyl-transfer RNA synthetase, phenylalanyl-tRNA ligase, phenylalanyl-transfer RNA ligase, L-phenylalanyl-tRNA synthetase, and phenylalanine translase.  This enzyme participates in phenylalanine, tyrosine and tryptophan biosynthesis and aminoacyl-tRNA biosynthesis.

Phenylalanine-tRNA synthetase (PheRS) is known to be among the most complex enzymes of the aaRS (Aminoacyl-tRNA synthetase) family. Bacterial and mitochondrial PheRSs share a ferredoxin-fold anticodon binding (FDX-ACB) domain, which represents a canonical double split alpha+beta motif having no insertions. The FDX-ACB domain displays a typical RNA recognition fold (RRM) formed by the four-stranded antiparallel beta sheet, with two helices packed against it.

Structural studies

References

Further reading
 

Protein domains
EC 6.1.1
Enzymes of known structure